The 1905 All England Open Badminton Championships was a badminton tournament held at the London Rifle Brigade Drill Hall, London, England, from March 1 to March 4, 1905.

Henry Marrett retained his men's singles title. Ethel Thomson and Meriel Lucas won a third women's doubles crown after retaining their title. Lucas also won her second singles title. There were no entries from Ireland.

Final results

Men's singles

Women's singles

Men's doubles

Women's doubles

Mixed doubles

References

All England Open Badminton Championships
All England
All England Open Badminton Championships in London
All England Championships
All England Badminton Championships
All England Badminton Championships